Giuseppe Olmo (22 November 1911 – 5 March 1992) was an Italian road bicycle racer. He competed at the 1932 Olympics and won a gold medal in the team road race, placing fourth individually. In October 1935 he set a new hour record at 45.090 km.

As with many Italian bicycle racers, after his retirement in the late 1930s he began building bicycles, and founded Olmo (also known as Olmo ). The Olmo  manufacturing center was set up in his home town of Celle Ligure Italy in 1938, where the company continues to manufacture their bicycles today.

Later in his life, Giuseppe (Often called "Gepin" for short) came to be known as a successful entrepreneur and between the 1940s and 1970s he expanded his company into several manufacturing industries. These individual businesses are all managed under the Olmo Group today. Olmo la  or Giuseppe Olmo spa, as the bicycle manufacture goes by today. They produced some very high quality bicycles often comparative quality to the great Colnago. Today they produce many high quality race bicycles, as well as mountain and city bicycles of ranging quality.

Major results

1932
, Olympic Team road race (with Attilio Pavesi and Guglielmo Segato)
1st, Milano–Torino
1933
1st, Stages 4 and 12, Giro d'Italia
1934
4th, Giro d'Italia
1st, Stages 13, 16 and 17
1935
1st, Milan–San Remo
3rd, Giro d'Italia
1st, Stages 5, 13, 17 and 18
1936
 National Road Race Championship
1st, Giro dell'Emilia
2nd, Giro d'Italia
1st, Stages 1, 5, 6, 11, 12, 13, 15b, 16, 17a and 19
1937
1st, Stage 6, Giro d'Italia
1938
1st, Milan–San Remo

References

External links

Palmarès by memoire-du-cyclisme.net 
Palmarès by velo-club.net 
company website
Olmo - Argentina
company website

 
 
 
 

1911 births
1992 deaths
Cyclists at the 1932 Summer Olympics
Italian Giro d'Italia stage winners
Italian male cyclists
Olympic cyclists of Italy
Olympic gold medalists for Italy
Sportspeople from the Province of Savona
Olympic medalists in cycling
Medalists at the 1932 Summer Olympics
Cyclists from Liguria
Italian cycle designers